Events from the year 1273 in poetry.

Deaths
 Rumi, (born 1207), 13th-century Turkish poet, Islamic jurist, theologian, and mystic

References

13th-century poetry
Poetry